John Leslie may refer to:

United Kingdom
 Sir John Leslie (physicist) (1766–1832), Scottish mathematician and physicist
 John Leslie (TV presenter) (born 1965), Scottish former television presenter
 John Leslie (bishop of Clogher) (1571–1671), Church of Scotland and Church of Ireland bishop
 John Leslie (bishop of Kilmore, Elphin and Ardagh) (1772–1854), Church of Ireland bishop
 John Leslie (cricketer, born 1888), English cricketer and British Army officer
 John Leslie (footballer) (born 1955), English footballer
 John Leslie (politician) (1873–1955), British Labour Party Member of Parliament for Sedgefield
 Sir John Leslie, 1st Baronet (1822–1916), Conservative Member of Parliament for Co. Monaghan, Ireland
 Sir John Leslie, 2nd Baronet (1857–1944), Irish landowner and soldier in the British Army
 Sir John Leslie, 4th Baronet (1916–2016), officer in the Irish Guards
 John Leslie, 1st Duke of Rothes (c. 1630–1681), Scottish nobleman
 John Leslie, 6th Earl of Rothes (1600–1641), Scottish nobleman
 John Leslie, 10th Earl of Rothes (1698–1767), British Army officer
 John Leslie, 11th Earl of Rothes (1744–1773), Scottish nobleman 
 John Leslie (priest) (1868–1934), Dean of Lismore 
 Shane Leslie (Sir John Randolph Leslie, 3rd Baronet, 1885–1971), Anglo-Irish soldier and writer
 John Leslie of Parkhill, involved in the murder of Cardinal David Beaton in 1546
 John Leslie, Lord Newton (1595-1651) Scottish judge and soldier killed at the Siege of Dundee

Other places

 John A. Leslie (born 1940), Canadian philosopher
 John A. Leslie (Canadian politician), former Ontario MPP for York East
 John Leslie (1919—2016), former patron of Gippsland Art Gallery, Australia
 John Leslie (cricketer, born 1814), Irish cricketer and barrister
 John Leslie (director) (1945–2010), American porn actor, director and producer
 John Leslie (rugby union) (born 1970), New Zealand rugby union footballer who played for Scotland
 John Robert Leslie (academic) (1831–1881), Irish academic associated with Trinity College Dublin

See also
 Jack Leslie (disambiguation)
 John Leslie Art Prize, an Australian art prize for landscape painting
 John Lesley (1527–1596), Scottish Roman Catholic bishop of Ross
 John Peter Lesley (1819–1903), American geologist
 John T. Lesley, pioneer in Tampa, Florida